Thomas "Tom" Christopher Buckner (born 16 April 1963) is an English former long-distance runner who finished fifth at the 1994 Commonwealth Games in Victoria, British Columbia,Canada, and reached the semifinals in the Barcelona Olympics  as well as winning the Amateur Athletic Association steeplechase on two occasions. He also represented Great Britain at the 1993 World Championships in Athletics. He ran the mile in 3.43 but this was downhill in Sheffield but did break the 4 minute barrier legally in Portsmouth running 3.58.8. He is the younger brother of Jack Buckner who was also an international athlete as was his sister Ruth. The brothers hold the record as the fastest brother milers ever in GB, 7th all time in the world.  All 3 of the Buckners attended Worksop College, a public school located in North Nottinghamshire.

Personal bests
800 metres - 1:49(1993)
1500 metres -3.42(1993)
One mile - 3:58.87 (1993)
3000 metres - 7:50.90 (1992)
3000 metres steeplechase - 8:25.50 (1992)
5000 metres - 14.02:93 (1994)
10000 metres (road) - 29:39.00 (1994)
Half marathon - 65:13 (1993)
Marathon - 2:21.40 (1995)

References

 British Olympic Committee

1963 births
Living people
English male long-distance runners
English male middle-distance runners
British male steeplechase runners
English male steeplechase runners
Olympic athletes of Great Britain
Athletes (track and field) at the 1992 Summer Olympics
Commonwealth Games competitors for England
Athletes (track and field) at the 1994 Commonwealth Games
World Athletics Championships athletes for Great Britain
People educated at Worksop College